Colonel Charles Valentin Marie Bugnet (14 August 1884 – 17 December 1955) was a French military officer who served, with the rank of major, as aide-de-camp to French general Ferdinand Foch from September 1919 until Foch's death in 1929. Bugnet served Marshal Foch for more than nine years, and he is credited with writing the first biography about Foch, Foch Speaks, finished in June 1929, just months after Foch's death in March of that year.  Bugnet was also a writer of books.  He died in Paris in 1955 of natural causes.

Bibliography
 Bugnet, Charles, Rue Saint-Dominique et G.Q.G. ou les Trois dictatures de la guerre (Rue Saint-Dominique and G.Q.G. or the Three Dictatorships of War), Paris: Plon, 1937
 Bugnet, Charles, LTC, Mangin, Paris: Plon, 1934
 Bugnet, Charles, De Marrakech à la Kasbah Tadla, 1912-1913 (From Marrakech to Kasbah Tadla, 1912-1913), (published in the book Mangin, pgs. 111-131), OCLC #: 949109531
 Bugnet, Charles, LTC, Le Maréchal Lyautey (Marshal Lyautey), Paris: Plon, 1933
 Bugnet, Charles, LTC, Le Maréchal Joffree (Marshal Joffre), Tours: Mame, 1931
 Bugnet, Charles, Listening to Marshal Foch (1921-1929), Paris: Grasset, 1929 (translated by Russell Green)
 Bugnet, Charles, MAJ, Foch Speaks, New York: Dial, 1929
 Bugnet, Charles, Le Collier de Pierres de Lune (The Moonstone Necklace), Paris: Bernard Grasset, 1922
 Bugnet, Charles, La Flamme Ensevelie, poèmes (The Buried Flame: to war widows, poems), Paris: Emile-Paul, 1916
 Bugnet, Charles, Mater Consolata, poèmes (Gathered Fragments, poems), unknown publisher and date
 Bugnet, Charles, Sensibilis (Sensitivity), unknown publisher and date

Footnotes

References 
 Bugnet, Charles, Foch Speaks, New York: Dial, 1929

 The Freeman's Journal, New York, 8 August 1929

External links
 Internet Archive (please sign up for a free account to read the book): Link
 Charles Bugnet BNF Archive
 Works by Charles Bugnet: Link

1884 births
1955 deaths
20th-century French military personnel